Pseudochazara geyeri, the Grey Asian grayling is a species of butterfly in the family Nymphalidae. It is confined to Albania, Greece, North Macedonia, eastern Turkey and south-western Transcaucasia.

Description in Seitz
S. geyeri H.-Schiff. (43c). Recalling autonoe, but the upperside is not so dark; the ground-colour is yellowish grey, the markings of the underside distinctly shining through and the dark veins being quite plain. Underside of forewing light, feebly shaded with yellowish; the hindwing beneath coarsely marmorated and white-veined, bearing beyond the middle a light band which is interrupted above and below the apex of the cell.
— On the east coast of the Black Sea, in Asia Minor, Armenia and Kurdistan, in July and August, very abundant.

Flight period 
The species is univoltine and on wing from late June to September.

Food plants
Larvae feed on grasses.

Subspecies
Pseudochazara geyeri geyeri
Pseudochazara geyeri karsicola Gross, 1978 (Armenian Highland)
Pseudochazara geyeri occidentalis (Rebel & Zerny, 1931) (Albania)

References

 Satyrinae of the Western Palearctic - Pseudochazara geyeri

Pseudochazara
Butterflies described in 1846
Butterflies of Europe